The beach volleyball tournaments at the 2007 Pan American Games were held from 16 to 22 July 2007 at the Arena de Copacabana, in Rio de Janeiro, Brazil.

Medal summary

Medal table
Key

Men's tournament

Women's tournament

See also
 Volleyball at the 2007 Pan American Games

References

 
 

Events at the 2007 Pan American Games
2007
Pan American Games